Ugur Group Companies  is a Turkish group of manufacturing companies.

The company was founded when Ugur Cooling started ice cream machine production in Nazilli in 1954. Today, the company produces a range of equipment including deep freezers to bottled water coolers, motorcycles, scooters and cosmetics, with the company operating Europe's second biggest refrigeration plant in Nazilli. The company operates in 142 countries under six brands.

The company presently has a total  of manufacturing area and 2,500 employees.

Group companies and brands

Ugur Cooling Inc. Co. 

Ugur Cooling Inc. Co. was founded in 1954 and is one of a product category under group companies. It includes its own brands named Ugur Cooling and Delta Cooling.

Ugur Cooling

Ugur Cooling is a Turkish foundation which started its production with producing icecream makers in 1954 in Nazilli, Aydın. Domestic Turkish brand Ugur Cooling is operating in 5 continents for 137 countries, participating Dubai exhibition today.  Ugur Cooling is known as a cooling group in Turkey, in the area of commercial coolers, freezers, ice cream and ice making machines as well.

All product groups:

Delta Cooling is powered by Ugur Cooling Inc. Co. in 2013 as a Turkish deep freeze company. The company takes its logo shape where the Greater Menderes River meets the sea with a triangular structure, and its color as a passion symbol.

Ugur Motor Vehicles Inc. Co. 

Ugur Motor Vehicles Inc. Co. has started its main activity in 2004 by their own registered brand Mondial in motorcycle sector.

Mondial Motor 
According to data of the Turkish Statistical Institute, Mondial was presented as Turkey's Best-Seller Motorcycle Brand in 2013. As today, Mondial is operating by its 400 sales points, 528 maintenance facilities and 250 auxiliary equipment sales points.

Kymco

Kymco was founded in 1964 in Taiwan. The company is operating with about 4,000 worker and producing more than 570,000 vehicles per year as one of world's biggest scooter, motorcycle, ATV manufacturer. Kymco is importing to The Far East, Asia, Europe, North and South America.
Kymco has signed distributorship agreement with Ugur Motor Vehicles Inc. Co. by July in 2014.
By this collaboration Kymco has started supporting marketing activities, support after purchase, auxiliary equipment and maintenance facility in Turkish market.

Motovento

Motovento was found to gather qualified world brands under the roof of Ugur Motor Vehicles Inc. Co. Helmets, apparels, shoes, underwear, motorcycle accessories and auxiliary equipments can be found under the brand of Motovento. The company cooperates Alpinestars, Brembo, Airoh Helmet, Choho, HJC Helmets, Interphone Cellularline, IXIL SILENCERS, JUST1 Helmets, KMC, NİTEK Handcraft Helmets, E Origine, Puig, Regina Chain, rizoma, SHAD, Shiro Helmets, SIX2.

E-Mon

E-mon has found in 2015 under Ugur Motor Vehicles Inc. Co. to produce environmentalist, low energy and anti noise pollution electric motor products.

Kuteks Inc. Co.

Kuteks Inc. Co., was founded in 1984 to produce medical consumables. The company has involved to Ugur Group Companies in 2002 and became its medical presenter in Turkey.
Brands under Kuteks Inc. Co. can be found as Kuteks and Fortune.

Kuteks

Producing medical consumables since 1984. Kuteks products are provided to pharmacies and hospitals through medical representatives. Additionally, Kuteks products are exported to many developed European countries as well as several other foreign countries.

All products:

Fortune

Kuteks has launched its own sub-brand named Fortune in 2010.

All products:

Uğur Integrated Food Ltd. Co. 

Ugur Integrated Food Ltd. Co. was established in 2011 in Dallıca, Nazilli under the roof of Ugur Group Companies. The company has its own dried food brand named U'Fresh.

U'Fresh 
U’fresh dried food has found in 2011 to produce and process (dried vegetable, fruit, meat etc.) on about 5,000 m2 indoor and 12,000 m2 outdoor area.  Production and process area has ovens to dry variety of vegetables, fruits etc. In addition, cooling products that preserves from 0, -18 till -40 can be found in the factory.

All product groups:

References 

Conglomerate companies of Turkey
Manufacturing companies of Turkey
Manufacturing companies established in 1954
1954 establishments in Turkey
Turkish brands